Cindy Lavonne Morgan (born June 4, 1968) is a contemporary Christian music singer and songwriter.

Morgan's 1992 debut album, Real Life, earned her six Dove Award nominations. Her follow-up, A Reason to Live, garnered her another Dove Award nomination. Overall she has earned 13 Dove Awards.

Morgan, using her married name (Brouwer), is also one half of the duo St. Lola in the Fields with Jeremy Bose. They released High Atop the Houses and the Towns on October 5, 2010 via Nettwerk.

In late 2012, Morgan joined forces with singer/songwriter Andrew Greer for Food for the Hungry's "Hymns for Hunger" Tour, helping raise awareness and resources for local and international hunger relief organizations at tour stops across the country.

Morgan has two daughters with ex-husband, Canadian author Sigmund Brouwer. Morgan married  Raleigh attorney Jonathan Richardson on September 17, 2022 and now alternates between residences in Nashville and Raleigh.

Discography
Cindy Morgan
 Real Life (1992)
 A Reason to Live (1993)
 Under the Waterfall (1995)
 Listen (1996)
 The Loving Kind (1998)
 The Best So Far (compilation, 2000)
 Elementary (2001)
 Postcards (2006)
 Beautiful Bird (2008)
 Hymns: Some Glad Morning (2010)
 Bows & Arrows (2015)
 Autumn & Eve: Old Testaments, Volume 1  (2019)

As Cindy Brouwer
 St. Lola in the Fields - High Atop the Houses and the Towns (2010)
 Merripennie (2016)

References

External links

Living people
American performers of Christian music
American women pop singers
1968 births
People from Claiborne County, Tennessee
21st-century American women